Dianna Fuemana (born 1973) is a New Zealand writer, director and performer. She writes for theatre and screen. Her solo play Mapaki was the first that brought a New Zealand born Niue perspective to the professional stage. In 2008 Fuemana won the Pacific Innovation and Excellence Award, at the Creative New Zealand Pasifika Arts Award. Fuemana was one of nine women writer-directors of the 2019 feature film Vai.

Biography 
Dianna Fuemana was born in New Zealand in 1973 and is one of seven children. Her mother is American Samoan and her father Togavale is Niuean. The singer Pauly Fuemana was her cousin. When she was a child she acted in church plays in her community. She went to Henderson High School in Auckland as a teenager, while she was there she attended a short course in performing arts run by Cath Cardiff and Jay Laga'aia. In 2005 she graduated with honours with a Master of Creativity and Performing Arts from Auckland University.

Career 
In 1997 Dianna Fuemana was one of three women acting in the play Frangipani Perfume written by Makerita Urale and after this in 1999 Fuemana wrote and performed in her own play, a solo show called Mapaki. For this she was nominated at the Chapman Tripp Theatre Awards for Outstanding New Writer and Best Upcoming Actress of the Year. After being performed in New Zealand Mapaki toured across the United States and in Athens, Greece.

Her screen work includes writing and directing the short film Sunday Fun Day, which premiered at the New Zealand International Film Festival and includes the perspective of a transgender teenager and a solo mother. She says of Sunday Fun Day:
This story came from the feeling of ‘vulnerability,’ as a mother raising teens. From my experience, teens don’t really understand vulnerability from a mother’s perspective. We have a load of films in New Zealand that focus on the child’s perspective but not from the strength and humor of a mother’s.Fuemana was one of nine writer-directors on the New Zealand Pacific Island feature film Vai released in 2019.

Plays 

 1999 - Mapaki - writer and performer
 2001 - Jingle Bells - writer
 2004 - The Packer - writer. Presentations include New Zealand, Australia, Edinburgh Fringe Festival
 2005 - My Mother Dreaming - writer
 2006 - Falemalama - writer
 2012 - Birds

Screen 

 Interrogation - TV - writer of episodes
 Good Hands - TV - writer of episodes
 Sunday Fun Day - short film - writer and director
 Vai - (2019) - film - writer/director - made in sections this film is also directed by eight other Pasifika women filmmakers: Sharon and Nicole Whippy, Becs Arahanga, Amberley Jo Aumua, Matasila Freshwater, Mīria George, 'Ofa-ki Guttenbeil-Likiliki and Marina Alofagia McCartney.

Awards 
2008 - Pacific Innovation and Excellence Award, Creative New Zealand Pasifika Arts Award.

Personal life 
Dianna Fuemana has three children and has attracted media attention as the wife of Jay Ryan. Her parents have been supportive of her career and her father wrote the song that opens her play Mapaki. Her father died in 2000 and she dedicated the Auckland season of Mapaki to him.

References

Living people
New Zealand dramatists and playwrights
21st-century New Zealand dramatists and playwrights
New Zealand people of Niuean descent
New Zealand people of Samoan descent
1973 births